Imlay City Community Schools is a public school district located in eastern Lapeer County, Michigan.  The district serves the city of Imlay City and its surrounding communities.  Approximately 2200 students are enrolled in one of five school buildings. In 2008 and again in 2013, Imlay City High School was awarded a bronze medal in the U.S. News & World Report's list of America's Best High Schools.

Schools 

 Weston Elementary (Grades PreK-2)
 Borland Elementary (Grades 3-5)
 Imlay City Middle School (Grades 6-8)
 Imlay City High School (Grades 9-12)
 Venture High School (Alternative High School, grades 9-12)

References

External links 

 Imlay City Community Schools official website, www.imlay.k12.mi.us/

School districts in Michigan
Education in Lapeer County, Michigan